The Revolution EP is the third release on US label Sub Pop by Duluth, Minnesota based band, Retribution Gospel Choir. The EP was released on March 27, 2012.

Track listing

External links
The Revolution EP on Sub Pop
Retribution Gospel Choir on Sub Pop
Retribution Gospel Choir Website

References

2012 EPs
Retribution Gospel Choir albums
Indie rock EPs
Sub Pop EPs